Telmaturgus is a genus of flies in the family Dolichopodidae. It has a cosmopolitan distribution.

Species

 Telmaturgus abidjanensis (Grichanov, 2008)
 Telmaturgus acutatus (Yang & Grootaert, 1999)
 Telmaturgus chebalingensis (Wang, Yang & Grootaert, 2005)
 Telmaturgus concavus (Yang & Grootaert, 1999)
 Telmaturgus congensis Grichanov, 2011
 Telmaturgus costaricensis Robinson, 1967
 Telmaturgus dorsiniger (Yang & Grootaert, 1999)
 Telmaturgus garambaensis (Grichanov, 2008)
 Telmaturgus kenyensis (Grichanov, 2008)
 Telmaturgus kovali (Grichanov, 2008)
 Telmaturgus kwandensis (Grichanov, 2008)
 Telmaturgus mastigomyoformis (Grichanov, 2008)
 Telmaturgus mulleri Grichanov, 2018
 Telmaturgus munroi (Curran, 1925)
 Telmaturgus parvus (Van Duzee, 1924)
 Telmaturgus pseudoviolaceus (Grichanov, 2008)
 Telmaturgus pulchrithorax Hollis, 1964
 Telmaturgus revanasiddaiahi (Olejnicek, 2002)
 Telmaturgus robinsoni Runyon, 2012
 Telmaturgus semarangensis Hollis, 1964
 Telmaturgus shettyi (Olejnicek, 2002)
 Telmaturgus silvestris Grichanov, 2018
 Telmaturgus simplicipes (Becker, 1908)
 Telmaturgus singularis (Yang & Grootaert, 1999)
 Telmaturgus triseta (Grichanov, 2008)
 Telmaturgus tumidulus (Raddatz, 1873)
 Telmaturgus uzungwa (Grichanov, 2008)
 Telmaturgus vockerothi Runyon, 2012
 Telmaturgus wonosoboensis Hollis, 1964

The following species were moved to Chaetogonopteron:
 Telmaturgus nodicornis (Becker, 1922)

References 

 Europe
 Nearctic

Dolichopodidae genera
Sympycninae
Brachyceran flies of Europe
Diptera of North America
Diptera of Africa
Diptera of Asia
Taxa named by Josef Mik